Beaumanoir was a seigniory in what is now the department of Côtes-d'Armor, France, which gave its name to an illustrious family.
 Philippe de Rémi (died 1265), French poet and bailiff
 Philippe de Rémi (died 1296), French jurist and royal official
 Jean de Beaumanoir (14th century), marshal of Brittany
 Jean de Beaumanoir (marquis) (1551–1614), seigneur and afterwards marquis de Lavardin
 Lucas de Beaumanoir, the Grand Master of the Templars, fictional character Ivanhoe

Notes

French-language surnames